The 2020 Súper Liga Americana de Rugby season was the inaugural season of Súper Liga Americana de Rugby, an annual rugby union competition sanctioned by Sudamérica Rugby. The competition began on 4 March and was scheduled to end on 29 May.

On 17 March 2020, the league was suspended until 2021, effectively ending this season after two rounds of play due to the COVID-19 pandemic in South America.

Teams

Season format
Five of the six clubs in the competition competed in the regular season, which was to take place over 10 weeks and would consist of a double round-robin, with each participating club playing 4 matches at home and 4 matches away. The top 4 clubs at the end of the regular season would have moved on to the championship playoffs while the fifth-place club would have progressed to a challenge trophy playoff.

The challenge trophy would have been contested over two matches between the fifth-place regular season club and Cafeteros Pro. Each club would have hosted one match in this series.

The championship would have been contested between the top four regular season clubs in a knockout tournament.

Regular season
The regular season began on 4 March and was scheduled to end on 16 May.

Standings 
<noinclude>

Matches
The following were the matches for the 2020 Super Liga Americana de Rugby regular season:

Updated to match(es) played on 7 March 2020 
Colors: Blue: home team win; Yellow: draw; Red: away team win.

Week 1

Week 2

Week 3

Week 4

Week 5

Week 6

Week 7

Week 8

Week 9

Week 10

Playoffs

Challenge Trophy
The fifth-place regular season club would have contested the challenge trophy against Cafeteros Pro over two matches.

Championship playoffs

Semifinals

Third-place match

Final

Player Statistics

Top scorers

The top try and point scorers during the 2020 Súper Liga Americana de Rugby season until the season was cancelled were:

References

Super Rugby Americas
2020 rugby union tournaments for clubs